Highbank Town is an unincorporated community in Jefferson Township, Pike County, in the U.S. state of Indiana.

History
Formerly known simply as High Banks, the community was so named for its location on a river bluff. A post office called High Banks was established in 1819, and remained in operation until it was discontinued in 1859. The community was laid out in 1837.

Geography

References

Unincorporated communities in Pike County, Indiana
Unincorporated communities in Indiana